Alfred Thomas Gurd (March 30, 1846 – August 15, 1919) was an Ontario farmer, entrepreneur and political figure. He represented Lambton West in the Legislative Assembly of Ontario from 1894 to 1898 as a Conservative-Protestant Protective Association member.

He was born in Moore Township, Lambton County in 1846, the son of William Gurd, an Irish immigrant, and was educated in Sarnia. He was an oil producer and also manufactured explosives. In 1879, he married Dell Shaw. Gurd was mayor of Petrolia in 1890, 1891 and 1894. He defeated Charles MacKenzie in the 1894 provincial election. Gurd was a master in the Masonic Order. In 1902, he drilled in Raleigh Township, producing the so-called "Gurd gusher". In 1910, Gurd moved to Tulsa, Oklahoma, where he continued to be involved in the oil industry.

References

External links 

The Canadian parliamentary companion, 1897 JA Gemmill
Commemorative biographical record of the county of Lambton, Ontario ..., JH Beers (1906)
Lambton County's Hundred Years, 1849 - 1949, V Lauriston (1949)

1846 births
1919 deaths
Progressive Conservative Party of Ontario MPPs
Protestant Protective Association MPPs
People from Lambton County
Mayors of places in Ontario
People from Tulsa, Oklahoma